Hanumanpur may refer to:
Hanumanpur, Gujarat, India
Hanumanpur, Orissa, India
Hanumanpur, Rajasthan, India